The 2003 Singer Sri Lankan Airlines Rugby 7s was the fifth year that the Singer Sri Lankan Airlines Rugby 7s tournament was held and was the first year that teams from Africa (Kenya, Morocco and the Arabian Gulf) and Oceania (Australia, New Zealand and the Cook Islands) participated.
Kenya defeated Portugal 16 points to 12 in the Cup final, with Arabian Gulf winning the Bowl and host nation, Sri Lanka, winning the Plate.

First round

Pool A

 12 - 00  Arabian Gulf
     31 - 07   Arabian Gulf
     40 - 00 
 Centurions 21 - 12 
 Centurions 42 - 00  Arabian Gulf
 Centurions 47 - 00 

{| class="wikitable" style="text-align: center;"
|-
!width="200"|Teams
!width="40"|Pld
!width="40"|W
!width="40"|D
!width="40"|L
!width="40"|PF
!width="40"|PA
!width="40"|+/−
!width="40"|Pts
|-style="background:#ccffcc"
|align=left|  Centurions
|3||3||0||0||110||12||+98||9
|-style="background:#ccffcc"
|align=left| 
|3||2||0||1||83||28||+55||7
|-style="background:#ffe6bd"
|align=left| 
|3||1||0||2||12||87||-75||5
|-style="background:#fcc6bd"
|align=left|  Arabian Gulf
|3||0||0||3||7||85||−78||3
|}

Pool B

 38 - 07 
 62 - 00 
 33 - 05 
 31 - 19 
 38 - 07  
 52 - 00 

{| class="wikitable" style="text-align: center;"
|-
!width="200"|Teams
!width="40"|Pld
!width="40"|W
!width="40"|D
!width="40"|L
!width="40"|PF
!width="40"|PA
!width="40"|+/−
!width="40"|Pts
|-style="background:#ccffcc"
|align=left| 
|3||3||0||0||121||26||+95||9
|-style="background:#ccffcc"
|align=left| 
|3||2||0||1||114||36||+78||7
|-style="background:#ffe6bd"
|align=left| 
|3||1||0||2||50||78||-28||5
|-style="background:#fcc6bd"
|align=left| 
|3||0||0||3||7||152||−145||3
|}

Pool C

 54 - 00 
 59 - 00 
 35 - 00  
 28 - 14 
 45 - 00 
 12 - 10 

{| class="wikitable" style="text-align: center;"
|-
!width="200"|Teams
!width="40"|Pld
!width="40"|W
!width="40"|D
!width="40"|L
!width="40"|PF
!width="40"|PA
!width="40"|+/−
!width="40"|Pts
|-style="background:#ccffcc"
|align=left| 
|3||3||0||0||85||24||+61||9
|-style="background:#ccffcc"
|align=left| 
|3||2||0||1||108||28||+80||7
|-style="background:#ffe6bd"
|align=left| 
|3||1||0||2||64||47||+17||5
|-style="background:#fcc6bd"
|align=left|  
|3||0||0||3||0||158||−158||3
|}

Pool D

 31 - 05 
 Potoroos 19 - 07 
 Potoroos 21 - 14 
 35 - 07 
 26 - 19  Potoroos
 12 - 07 

{| class="wikitable" style="text-align: center;"
|-
!width="200"|Teams
!width="40"|Pld
!width="40"|W
!width="40"|D
!width="40"|L
!width="40"|PF
!width="40"|PA
!width="40"|+/−
!width="40"|Pts
|-style="background:#ccffcc"
|align=left| 
|3||3||0||0||73||33||+40||9
|-style="background:#ccffcc"
|align=left|  Potoroos
|3||2||0||1||59||47||+12||7
|-style="background:#ffe6bd"
|align=left| 
|3||1||0||2||45||59||-14||5
|-style="background:#fcc6bd"
|align=left|  
|3||0||0||3||26||64||−38||3
|}

Second round

Bowl

Plate

Cup

References

Sri Lanka Sevens
2003 in Sri Lankan sport
Singer